Jill Green is a Canadian Progressive Conservative politician who has represented Fredericton North in the Legislative Assembly of New Brunswick since 2020.

Green is a member of the Executive Council of New Brunswick.

Electoral history

References 

Living people
Progressive Conservative Party of New Brunswick MLAs
Women MLAs in New Brunswick
Politicians from Fredericton
21st-century Canadian women politicians
Year of birth missing (living people)
Women government ministers of Canada